
Gmina Przeworno is a rural gmina (administrative district) in Strzelin County, Lower Silesian Voivodeship, in south-western Poland. It is part of the Wrocław metropolitan area.

Neighbouring gminas
Gmina Przeworno is bordered by the gminas of Grodków, Kamiennik, Strzelin, Wiązów and Ziębice.

Villages
The gmina contains the villages of Cierpice, Dobroszów, Dzierzkowa, Głowaczów, Jagielnica, Jagielno, Jegłowa, Karnków, Kaszówka, Konary, Królewiec, Krynka, Krzywina, Miłocice, Mników, Ostrężna, Płosa, Pogroda, Przeworno, Romanów, Rożnów, Samborowice, Samborowiczki, Sarby, Stanica, Strużyna, Wieliczna and Wieliszów.

References

Przeworno
Strzelin County